The Gluek House is a historic Colonial Revival house in Minneapolis, Minnesota, United States.  The house was built by John and Minnie Gluek.  John was the son of the founder of the Gluek Brewing Company, a regional brewery in the Minneapolis area.  The house was listed on the National Register of Historic Places on February 9, 1990.

Architectural historian Paul Larson, who wrote the National Register nomination, cited it as a fine example of Victorian architecture with its Georgian Revival detail and ornamentation.  The two-story carriage house in back is even more distinctive, with quarters for horses as well as storage for the hay that fed them.  Larson said the carriage house "has to have the fanciest hay storage doors in the Twin Cities."  Many of the details inside the house are still intact, including the original icebox.

The house has recently been purchased by new owners, who plan to modernize the house while keeping its historical character.

See also
 National Register of Historic Places listings in Hennepin County, Minnesota

References

Carriage houses in the United States
Colonial Revival architecture in Minnesota
Houses completed in 1902
Houses in Minneapolis
Houses on the National Register of Historic Places in Minnesota
National Register of Historic Places in Minneapolis
Carriage houses on the National Register of Historic Places
Transportation buildings and structures on the National Register of Historic Places in Minnesota